The White Horse is a Russian TV serial broadcast in 1993. The film, in 10 episodes, was directed by Gelii Ryabov. It presents the Russian civil war in Siberia from 1917–1920 and the struggle of the White Russians under the command of Admiral Alexander Kolchak against the Bolshevik forces, until his final defeat.

Plot
The series was the first important cinematographic production after the fall of the Soviet Union to address the subject of the Russian Revolution and Civil War from 1917 to 1920. The series presents the fates of several characters on both sides of the conflict, caught in the turmoil of events beyond their control. It also shows important events which took place in that period, such as the assassination of Tsar Nicholas II and his family, as well as the struggle of Admiral Alexander Kolchak, head of state of the counter-revolutionary Russia until his defeat by the Bolsheviks. The director does not take sides and presents the revolution and the civil war as a cruel and senseless confrontation between two parts of the people, in which nobody is a real winner and all ordinary people are losers.

Actors and roles

See also
The Admiral, the 2008 biopic about Kolchak

References

External links

Historical television series
1990s Russian television series
1993 Russian television series debuts
1993 Russian television series endings
Russian television miniseries
Russian drama television series
Cultural depictions of Alexander Kolchak
Russian biographical television series